Elizabethan Serenade is a light music composition by Ronald Binge. When it was first played by the Mantovani orchestra in 1951, it was simply titled "Andante cantabile", although the original orchestral manuscript parts in Ronald Binge's own hand show the title "The Man in the Street" (possibly the title of an early television documentary). The name was altered by the composer to reflect the post-war optimism of a "new Elizabethan Age" that began with the accession of Queen Elizabeth II in February 1952.

The piece won Binge an Ivor Novello award and also had chart success in Germany (recorded by the Günther Kallmann Choir in 1962) and South Africa. A version with lyrics by poet Christopher Hassall called Where the Gentle Avon Flows was released and the work also had lyrics added in German, Czech, Norwegian, Swedish, Finnish, Dutch, Danish and French. The piece was used as the signature tune to Music in Miniature on the BBC Light Programme.

In 1968, a reggae version titled "Elizabeth Reggae" by Boris Gardiner & the Love People was released. It was re-issued as "Elizabethan Reggae" with a different b-side in 1969 (This version was initially erroneously credited to the track's producer, Byron Lee and the Dragonaires).

In 1982, Louise Tucker recorded a different vocal version entitled "Only For You" on the album Midnight Blue.

References

1951 compositions
Compositions by Ronald Binge